Christian Sussi (born 7 March 2001) is an Italian footballer who plays as a midfielder for  club Fiorenzuola on loan from Pisa.

Career

Arezzo
In June 2019, Sussi signed his first professional contract with the club. He made his league debut for the club on 25 August 2019, coming on as a late substitute for Niccolò Belloni in a 3-1 victory over Lecco.

Pisa
On 14 July 2021, he signed a three-year contract with Pisa.

Loan to Paganese
On 5 August 2021, he joined Paganese on loan.

Fiorenzuola
On 20 August 2022, Sussi was loaned to Fiorenzuola.

References

External links

2001 births
Living people
Italian footballers
Association football midfielders
S.S. Arezzo players
Pisa S.C. players
Paganese Calcio 1926 players
U.S. Fiorenzuola 1922 S.S. players
Serie C players